The Treasurer of Western Australia is the title held by the Cabinet Minister who is responsible for the management of Western Australia's public sector finances, and for preparing and delivering the annual State Budget. With only rare exceptions, until 2001, the position of Treasurer was usually held by the Premier of Western Australia.

Up until the government of Philip Collier in 1924, the position was called Colonial Treasurer.

List of treasurers of Western Australia

References

Western Australia
 
Western Australia-related lists